Sigil Games Online, Inc. was a computer game developer based in Carlsbad, California founded in January 2002 by Brad McQuaid and Jeff Butler, key development team members who created EverQuest, the most popular massively multiplayer online role-playing game before World of Warcraft. McQuaid and Butler left Sony Online Entertainment (SOE), the publisher of EverQuest, and formed Sigil Games Online to develop "the next big thing". McQuaid told the video game website IGN, "I find myself much happier at the results of assembling an all-star team of MMOG developers and focusing on making one ground-breaking, unprecedented project, as opposed to being spread thin like I was as VP/CCO at Verant/SOE.". Sigil released their only game "Vanguard: Saga of Heroes" on January 30, 2007 after several well publicized delays and a last minute switch from publishing with Microsoft to publishing again with SOE. On May 15, 2007, SOE announced that they had completed a transaction to purchase key assets of Sigil Games Online. As a result, SOE now owns Vanguard: Saga of Heroes, described as Sigil's "tent pole property".

Vanguard: Saga of Heroes

McQuaid and Butler formerly worked for Sony Online Entertainment on the team developing EverQuest. After their departure, they formed Sigil; on May 16, 2002, Sigil announced that they had reached an exclusive publishing deal with Microsoft and they began work on "Vanguard: Saga of Heroes". With the pedigree of the "all-star" team at Sigil and the bravado of CEO Brad McQuaid, there were very high expectations for the game among MMO fans and the press.

An early marketing fact sheet for Vanguard included the following: "Vanguard: Saga of Heroes will be the premier third generation massively multiplayer RPG. A vast, seamless, immersive virtual world filled with elements of familiar High Fantasy, including traditional themes and more, all depicted using cutting-edge graphics technology. Sigil's expertise and experience in the field will bring groundbreaking static and dynamic content to the genre. Vanguard will build upon the successes and strengths of earlier MMORPGs to improve popular game mechanics and features, but also address these pioneering games' mistakes and deficiencies. Vanguard will focus heavily on interdependence, challenge, and reward, while simultaneously addressing tedious and annoying issues, including camping, excessive downtime and more."

Originally, Sigil worked with Microsoft to co-publish 'Vanguard but after 4 years, and less than one year before the game's release, the partnership was quickly dissolved. On May 5, 2006 Sigil announced that they had negotiated a deal to purchase the rights to Vanguard back from Microsoft, and at the same time announced that they had arranged a co-publishing deal between Sigil and Sony Online Entertainment. "Vanguard: Saga of Heroes" was released on January 30, 2007, co-published by Sigil and Sony Online Entertainment. While initial preview coverage was positive the launch lead to disappointing reviews.

Acquisition
Sigil Games Online had around 150 employees at the time they released their only game, Vanguard: Saga of Heroes, on January 30, 2007. The development team continued to address the well-documented technical issues users experienced at launch for several months. On May 14, 2007, the staff of Sigil Games Online were told to meet in the parking lot at 4:30PM and to take with them what they would need for the rest of the day. The employees were told that the launch of the game had not gone well, the company was in financial trouble and they were selling the company to Sony Online Entertainment. Director of Production, Andy Platter, then told the employees "You're all fired."

The following day, May 15, 2007, Sony Online Entertainment announced that they had acquired Sigil's "key assets", while further stating that Sony Online Entertainment would hire approximately fifty of Sigil's employees and that Brad McQuaid would be consultant to SOE as a creative advisor for Vanguard. Sony Online Entertainment's President John Smedley communicated the announcement to "Vanguard's" playerbase via the game's official forums.

References

External links
Sigil Games Online at MobyGames

Defunct video game companies of the United States
Video game development companies
Software companies based in California
Companies based in Carlsbad, California
Video game companies established in 2002
Video game companies disestablished in 2007
2007 mergers and acquisitions
2002 establishments in California
2007 disestablishments in California
Defunct companies based in California
Defunct software companies of the United States